HD 30562 is a star in the equatorial constellation of Eridanus. It has a golden hue and can be viewed with the naked eye under good seeing conditions, having an apparent visual magnitude of 5.77. The distance to this star is 85 light years based on parallax. It is drifting further away with a high radial velocity of +77 km/s, having come to within  some 236,000 years ago.

The stellar classification of HD 30562 has varied somewhat depending on the study, including types G2IV, G5V, and F8V. It is about 4.4 billion years old and appears to be chromospherically inactive. The star is spinning with a projected rotational velocity of 5.8 km/s, giving it a rotation period of 24.2 days. Based on the abundance of iron appearing in the sprectrum, the metallicity of this star, what astronomers term the abundance of elements with higher atomic numbers than helium, is about 70% higher than in the Sun. HD 30562 has 25% greater mass than the Sun and a 57% larger radius. The star is radiating almost three times the luminosity of the Sun from its photosphere at an effective temperature of 5,983 K.

Planetary system
In August 2009, it was found that this star has a Jupiter-like planet that orbits in a very eccentric path.

See also 
 List of extrasolar planets

References 

F-type main-sequence stars
Planetary systems with one confirmed planet

Eridanus (constellation)
BD-05 1044
0177.1
030562
022336
1536